Ruellia is a genus of flowering plants commonly known as ruellias or wild petunias. They are not closely related to petunias (Petunia) although both genera belong to the same euasterid clade. The genus was named in honor of Jean Ruelle (1474–1537), herbalist and physician to Francis I of France and translator of several works of Dioscorides.

Apart from the numerous formerly independent genera nowadays considered synonymous with Ruellia, the segregate genera Blechum, Eusiphon, Polylychnis and Ulleria are often included in Ruellia. Acanthopale, however, is considered a distinct genus.

Ruellias are popular ornamental plants. Some are used as medicinal plants, but many are known or suspected to be poisonous. Their leaves are food for the caterpillars of several Lepidoptera (butterflies and moths), typically Nymphalinae and in particular members of their tribe Junoniini, such as the larvae of the banded peacock (Anartia fatima). Nymphalinae using Ruellia as host plants include the common buckeye (Junonia coenia), recorded on R. nodiflora, the lemon pansy (Junonia lemonias), recorded on R. tuberosa, and the malachite butterfly (Siproeta stelenes) and Australian lurcher (Yoma sabina), which are recorded on several species.

Selected species

 Ruellia acutangula
 Ruellia affinis (Schrad.) Lindau
 Ruellia angustior
 Ruellia asperula
 Ruellia blumei Steud.
 Ruellia bourgaei  Hemsl.
 Ruellia brevicaulis
 Ruellia brevifolia (Pohl) C.Ezcurra – tropical wild petunia, red Christmas pride
 Ruellia capitata
 Ruellia caroliniensis (J.F.Gmel.) Steud.
 Ruellia cernua Roxb.
 Ruellia chartacea (T.Anderson) Wassh.
 Ruellia ciliatiflora Hook.
 Ruellia ciliosa Pursh
 Ruellia colorata (might belong in R. trivialis)
 Ruellia currorii
 Ruellia densa
 Ruellia devosiana Jacob-Makoy ex E.Morren
 Ruellia dielsii
 Ruellia diffusa
 Ruellia dioscoridis
 Ruellia dissitifolia
 Ruellia drymophila Hand.-Mazz.
 Ruellia elegans Poir.
 Ruellia eriocalyx
 Ruellia eurycodon
 Ruellia flava
 Ruellia formosa
 Ruellia fulgida Andrews
 Ruellia geminiflora – ipecacuanha-da-flor-roxa (Portuguese)
 Ruellia glanduloso-punctata
 Ruellia hapalotricha
 Ruellia helianthemum
 Ruellia humilis Nutt. – fringeleaf wild petunia, plains petunia, fringeleaf ruellia, hairy ruellia, low ruellia, zigzag ruel
 Ruellia hypericoides
 Ruellia incomta
 Ruellia insignis
 Ruellia jaliscana  Standl.
 Ruellia kuriensis
 Ruellia macrantha (Nees) Gower – Christmas pride
 Ruellia macrophylla Vahl
 Ruellia makoyana Hort.Makoy ex Closon
 Ruellia mcvaughii  T.F. Daniel
 Ruellia menthoides
 Ruellia neesiana
 Ruellia nitens
 Ruellia noctiflora
 Ruellia novogaliciana T.F. Daniel
 Ruellia nudiflora (Engelm. & A.Gray) Urb.
 Ruellia patula
 Ruellia paulayana
 Ruellia pedunculata
 Ruellia pohlii
 Ruellia portellae (might belong in R. trivialis)
 Ruellia prostrata Poir.
 Ruellia puri
 Ruellia rasa
 Ruellia rosea (Nees) Hemsl.
 Ruellia rufipila
 Ruellia salicifolia
 Ruellia simplex C.Wright
 Ruellia sindica
 Ruellia spissa  Leonard
 Ruellia squarrosa (Fenzl) Cufod.
 Ruellia stemonacanthoides  (Oerst.) Hemsl.
 Ruellia stenandrium
 Ruellia strepens L. (might belong in R. trivialis)
 Ruellia tomentosa
 Ruellia trachyphylla
 Ruellia trivialis
 Ruellia tuberosa L. – minnie root, fever root, snapdragon root, sheep potato, popping pod, duppy gun, cracker plant (syn. R. picta)
 Ruellia verbasciformis
 Ruellia villosa
 Ruellia vindex
 Ruellia zeylanica

Formerly placed here
Numerous plants, mainly in the family Acanthaceae, are former members of Ruellia. Some examples are:
Asystasia gangetica subsp. micrantha (Nees) Ensermu (as R. intrusa Forssk.)
Asystasia gangetica subsp. gangetica (as R. zeylanica J.Koenig ex Roxb.)
Blepharis ciliaris (L.) B.L.Burtt (as R. ciliaris L. or R. persica Burm.f.)
Dyschoriste oblongifolia (Michx.) Kuntze (as R. oblongifolia Michx.)
Hemigraphis repanda (L.) Hallier f. (as R. repanda L.)
Hygrophila costata Nees et al. (as R. brasiliensis Spreng.)
Hygrophila difformis (L.f.) Blume (as R. difformis L. f.)
Hygrophila lacustris (Schltdl. & Cham.) Nees (as R. lacustris Schltdl. & Cham.)
Hygrophila ringens (L.) R. Br. ex Steud. (as R. ringens L. or R. salicifolia Vahl)
Lepidagathis alopecuroidea (Vahl) R. Br. ex Griseb. (as R. alopecuroidea Vahl)
Lindernia antipoda (L.) Alston (as R. antipoda L.)
Stenandrium dulce (Cav.) Nees (as R. dulcis Cav.)
Strobilanthes anisophylla (Lodd. et al.) T. Anderson (as R. anisophylla Lodd. et al.)
Strobilanthes hamiltoniana (Steud.) Bosser & Heine (as R. hamiltoniana Steud.)
Teliostachya alopecuroidea Nees (as R. alopecuroidea, R. alopecuroides)

See also
 21540 Itthipanyanan, an asteroid named after a student who authored an award-winning experiment on the dehiscence and dispersion of Ruellia tuberosa seed pods.

References

External links

Germplasm Resources Information Network: Copioglossa
PlantSystematics: Ruellia
Classification: Ruellia, species list at USDA Natural Resources Conservation Service 
Tree of Life: Ruellia.

 
Acanthaceae genera